TraumaMan is a surgical simulation manikin used for teaching surgical skills, including the American College of Surgeons' Advanced Trauma Life Support (ATLS) program, to medical professionals. TraumaMan is also used to advance surgical skills in combat situations.

The TraumaMan surgical trainer has become a preferred alternative to the use of animals by both medical students and instructors alike for teaching emergency trauma surgical skills.

TraumaMan is used to train on the following surgical procedures 
 Cricothyroidotomy
 Percutaneous tracheostomy
 Needle decompression
 Chest tube insertion
 Pericardiocentesis
 Diagnostic peritoneal lavage
 Intravenous cutdown

References

External links 
 Simulab: TraumaMan

Trauma surgery